The DreamChaser Tour was the debut concert tour by American recording artist Jessica Simpson. It supported her second studio album, Irresistible and visited United States.

Background
In contrast to her previous co-headlining tour with 98 Degrees, Simpson wanted "DreamChaser" to present her as a singer and a performer, in the mold of Spears. Simpson decided to make the tour risque by adding more backup dancers and wearing skimpier clothing. She took dance lessons for the tour, as she felt that she had to transform herself into a performer. The tour was set up on a portable stage called the "Extreme Mobile Venue", with a capacity to hold 10,000 people, and ran in mall parking lots. The arena featured a  stadium stage, complete with a sound system and lights. Arrangements for concertgoers to bungee jump, climb a rock wall, and go mechanical surfing while the singer was not performing were also provided. The venue featured interactive games and exhibits, and was supported by a -high ramp for extreme motorcycle riders. The tour openers included Eden's Crush, Youngstown, Toya, and Plus One. It was choreographed by Dan Karaty.

The tour launched on August 7, 2001, at Corpus Christi, Texas, and ran twenty-five dates through mid-September. Tickets price ranged between $29.99 and $39.99. In an interview with Deseret News, Simpson said that it "was a fun tour. That was like a preparation for me. It was one of those things where I just wanted to go out and meet all my fans." A video tape, titled Dream Chaser, was released on January 22, 2002, which included Simpson's biography, music videos, behind-the-scenes looks at "Irresistible" and "A Little Bit", and footage from the tour. The tape reached number twenty-five on Billboard Top Music Videos chart, for the issue dated February 9, 2002.

Setlist
 "Hot Like Fire"
 "I Think I'm In Love With You"
 "I've Got My Eyes On You"
 "When You Told Me You Loved Me"
 "A Little Bit"
 "What's It Gonna Be"
 "Imagination" 
 "Final Heartbreak"
 "Where You Are"
 "For Your Love"
 "His Eye On The Sparrow" / "I Believe I Can Fly" 
 "I Wanna Love You Forever"
 "Forever In Your Eyes"
 "I Never" 
Encore
 "Irresistible" (contains elements of So So Def Remix)

Tour dates

References

Works cited

External links
Simpson's Official Website

2001 concert tours